British Rock band Boston Manor have currently released three studio albums, four EPs and eleven singles.

Studio albums

EPs

Split EPs

Singles

Other songs

Music videos

References 

Discographies of British artists
Rock music group discographies